Seth Saarinen (born 5 May 2001) is a Finnish footballer who plays as a right-back for Veikkausliiga side KuPS.

Early life
Saarinen was born to a Swiss mother and a Finnish father, and he holds dual citizenship of Finland and Switzerland.

Career statistics

Club

Notes

References

2001 births
Living people
Finnish footballers
Swiss men's footballers
Finland youth international footballers
Association football defenders
Helsingin Jalkapalloklubi players
FC Zürich players
Klubi 04 players
FC Haka players
Kuopion Palloseura players
Ykkönen players
Kakkonen players
Veikkausliiga players
Finnish people of Swiss descent
Swiss people of Finnish descent